Phaio longipennis is a moth of the subfamily Arctiinae. It was described by Berthold Neumoegen in 1894. It is found on Cuba. The specific name was spelled "longipenuis" in the original 1894 description, and emended to "longipennis" in 1898; under ICZN Article 33.2.3.1 the emended spelling is to be preserved.

References

Arctiinae
Moths described in 1894
Endemic fauna of Cuba